is a stand-alone Japanese given name along with "Tarō", and a common name suffix for males.

Possible writings
Jirō can be written using different kanji characters and can mean:

 次郎, "next, son"
 次朗, "next, melodious"
 二郎, "second, son"
 二朗, "second, melodious"
 治郎, "reign, son"

The name can also be written in hiragana or katakana.

People
 Jiro (musician) (born 1972), bassist of the Japanese rock band GLAY
 Jiro Aichi (治郎, born 1969), Japanese politician
 Jirō Akagawa (次郎, born 1948), Japanese novelist
 Jiro Akama (二郎, born 1968), Japanese politician
 Jiro Ando (慈朗), Japanese manga artist
 Jirō Asada (次郎, born 1951), Japanese novelist
 , Japanese footballer
 , Japanese engineer
 Jiro Horikoshi (二郎, 1903–1982), chief engineer behind many Japanese fighters of WWII
 , Japanese weightlifter
 Jiro Kamiharako (次郎, born 1966), Japanese ski jumper
 Jiro Kikkawa (1929–2016), Japanese Australian ornithologist
 Jiro Manio (born 1992), Filipino actor
 Jiro Nakano (二郎, 1902–2000), Japanese composer
 , Japanese ice hockey player
 , Japanese politician
 Jiro Ono (chef) (born 1925), chef and owner of Sukiyabashi Jiro, a three-Michelin-starred restaurant 
 Jiro Ono (politician) (born 1953), Japanese politician of Your Party
 , Japanese voice actor
 , Japanese businessman
 Jiro Wang (born 1981), Taiwanese actor and singer

Characters

 Jiro (Blue Dragon) (ジーロ), a character in the Blue Dragon video game
 Jiro (Kamen Rider) (次狼) or Garulu (ガルル), a supporting character in the Kamen Rider Kiva tokusatsu series
 Jiro (Kikaider) (ジロー), the main protagonist in the Android Kikaider tokusatsu series
Jiro Mochizuki, main protagonist in Black Blood Brothers
 Jiro Ueda (次郎), the main character in Trick TV series
Jiro Shirogane, fantasy persona of Takashi "Shiro" Shirogane in Voltron: Legendary Defender
 Jiro Yamada  (山田 二郎), the second child of the team called Buster Bros!!! from Hypnosis Mic: Division Rap Battle - Rhyme Anima

Other uses
 Jiro (ジロ), the famed Sakhalin Husky of the 1958 Japanese Antarctica expedition, depicted in the 1983 Japanese film Nankyoku Monogatari; see Taro and Jiro
 Erlang Shen 二郎神 Chinese god

Japanese masculine given names